A halogenated ether is a subcategory of a larger group of chemicals known as ethers.  An ether is an organic chemical that contains an ether group—an oxygen atom connected to two (substituted) alkyl groups.  A good example of an ether is the solvent diethyl ether.

What differentiates a halogenated ether from other types of ethers is the substitution (halogenation) of one or more hydrogen atoms with a halogen atom.  Halogen atoms include fluorine, chlorine, bromine, and iodine.

Use in anesthesiology 

Perhaps the most common use of halogenated ethers has been in anesthesiology.  The first widely used inhalation anesthetic was diethyl ether, which is a non-substituted (non-halogenated) ether. This drug enabled surgeons to perform otherwise painful operations on patients after rendering them unconscious.

Diethyl ether has the unfortunate disadvantage of being extremely flammable, especially in the presence of enriched oxygen mixtures. This property has resulted in many instances of fires and even explosions in operating rooms during surgery. This is among the most important reasons that diethyl ether has fallen out of favor as a general anesthetic. Diethyl ether is still commonly used as a solvent and reagent in organic chemistry laboratories, though with caution.

Diethyl ether was initially replaced by non-flammable (but more toxic) halogenated hydrocarbons such as chloroform and trichloroethylene. Halothane is another halogenated hydrocarbon anesthetic agent which was introduced into clinical practice in 1956. Due to its ease of use and improved safety profile with respect to organ toxicity, halothane quickly replaced chloroform and trichloroethylene.

All inhalation anesthetics in current clinical use are halogenated ethers, except for halothane (which is a halogenated hydrocarbon or haloalkane), nitrous oxide, and xenon.

Halogenated ethers have the advantages of being non-flammable as well as less toxic than earlier general anesthetics.  Halogenated ethers differ from other ethers because they contain at least one halogen atom in each molecule.  Examples of halogenated ethers include the general anesthetics isoflurane, desflurane, and sevoflurane. However, not all halogenated ethers have anesthetic effects, and some compounds such as flurothyl do the opposite and have stimulant and convulsant effects.

Inhalation anesthetics are vaporized and mixed with other gases prior to their inhalation by the patient before or during surgery. These other gases always include oxygen or air, but may also include other gases such as nitrous oxide or helium. In most surgical situations, other drugs such as opiates are used for pain and skeletal muscle relaxants are used to cause temporary paralysis.  Additional drugs such as midazolam may be used to produce amnesia during surgery. Although newer intravenous anesthetics (such as propofol) have increased the options of anesthesiologists, halogenated ethers remain a mainstay of general anesthesia.

See also 
Anesthesia
Ether
Halogen 
Halogenation 
Hydrocarbon

References

General anesthetics
Ethers
Organohalides
GABAA receptor positive allosteric modulators
NMDA receptor antagonists